What's Twice? is the first compilation extended play by South Korean girl group Twice. It was released exclusively in Japan on February 24, 2017, by Warner Music Japan and features four of their Korean songs from their first three extended plays: The Story Begins (2015),  Page Two (2016) and Twicecoaster: Lane 1 (2016).

What's Twice? was released as the promotional tool for Twice's announcement on February 24, 2017, for their Japanese debut in June 2017. Their first Japanese album, #Twice, was released on June 28, 2017, and is a compilation of Japanese versions of their previous Korean singles. #Twice  debuted and peaked at No. 2 on the Oricon Albums Chart and was certified Platinum by the Recording Industry Association of Japan (RIAJ) by selling over 250,000 physical copies.

Track listing

Charts

References

2017 EPs
Twice (group) EPs
JYP Entertainment EPs
Warner Music Japan EPs
Korean-language EPs